Krzysztof Potaczek (born 23 April 1958) is a Polish gymnast. He competed in seven events at the 1980 Summer Olympics.

References

1958 births
Living people
Polish male artistic gymnasts
Olympic gymnasts of Poland
Gymnasts at the 1980 Summer Olympics
People from Nysa, Poland
Sportspeople from Opole Voivodeship
20th-century Polish people